Subdivisions of the genus Oenothera in the Onagraceae (evening primrose) family:

Section Anogra
Oenothera sect. Angora  – western North America in dry, sandy soils in deserts, grasslands, and forest openings, up to 2000 m. elevation.

 Oenothera arizonica  – California evening primrose (Arizona & Mexico)
 Oenothera californica  – California evening primrose
 O. californica ssp. avita 
 O. californica ssp. californica
 O. californica ssp. eurekensis  – Eureka Dunes evening primrose
 Oenothera deltoides  – birdcage evening primrose
 O. deltoides ssp. ambigua 
 O. deltoides ssp. cognata 
 O. deltoides ssp. deltoides
 O. deltoides ssp. howellii ( - Antioch Dunes evening primrose
 O. deltoides ssp. piperi 
 Oenothera engelmannii  – Engelmann's evening primrose (south-central U.S.)
 Oenothera neomexicana  – New Mexico evening primrose (Arizona, New Mexico)
 Oenothera nuttallii  – Nuttall's evening primrose (central North America)
 Oenothera pallida  – pale evening primrose, white buttercup (western North America)
 O. pallida ssp. gypsophila  – whitepole evening primrose
 O. pallida ssp. pallida
 O. pallida ssp. runcinata 
 O. pallida ssp. trichocalyx 
 Oenothera wigginsii  – (Baja California in Mexico)

Section Calylophus
Oenothera sect. Calylophus  – in North American Great Plains and south to central Mexico.

Oenothera berlandieri  – Mexican evening primrose
 O. berlandieri ssp. berlandieri
 O. berlandieri ssp. pinifolia 
 Oenothera serrulata  – yellow sundrops

Oenothera hartwegii  – Hartweg's sundrops
 O. hartwegii ssp. fendleri 
 O. hartwegii ssp. filifolia 
 O. hartwegii ssp. hartwegii
 O. hartwegii ssp. maccartii 
 O. hartwegii ssp. pubescens 
 Oenothera lavandulifolia  – lavenderleaf sundrops
 Oenothera toumeyi  – Toumey's sundrops
 Oenothera tubicula  – Texas sundrops
 O. tubicula ssp. strigulosa 
 O. tubicula ssp. tubicula

Section Contortae
Oenothera sect. Contortae  – Sierra Nevadas of California, extending just into western Nevada.

 Oenothera xylocarpa  – woodyfruit evening primrose

Section Eremia
Oenothera sect. Eremia  – western North America, with a distribution in the Chihuahuan, Mojave, and Sonoran deserts.

 Oenothera primiveris  – desert evening primrose
 O. primiveris ssp. bufonis  – large yellow desert primrose
 O. primiveris ssp. primiveris

Section Gaura
Oenothera sect. Gaura  – beeblossom (includes most of the taxa formerly placed in genus Gaura)<ref>{{GRIN | O. sect. Gaura | 458521 | accessdate = 2011-12-09}}</ref>

 Oenothera boquillensis  – Rio Grande beeblossom (Texas & Mexico)
 Oenothera suffrutescens  – scarlet beeblossom (western North America)

 Oenothera coloradensis  (Nebraska, Wyoming, Colorado, New Mexico)
 O. coloradensis ssp. coloradensis – Colorado beeblossom or butterfly plant
 O. coloradensis ssp. neomexicana  – New Mexico beeblossom
 Oenothera demareei  – Demaree's beeblossom
 Oenothera filiformis  – biennial gaura
 Oenothera gaura  – (eastern North America, from Ontario to South Carolina and Minnesota to Missouri)
 Oenothera hexandra 
 O. hexandra ssp. gracilis 
 O. hexandra ssp. hexandra Oenothera lindheimeri 
 Oenothera patriciae 
 Oenothera simulans 
 Oenothera suffulta 
 O. suffulta ssp. suffulta O. suffulta ssp. nealleyi 
 Oenothera triangulata 

 Oenothera anomala  – anomalous Oenothera (Mexico)

 Oenothera curtiflora  – lizard tail (North America)

 Oenothera glaucifolia  – false gaura (southern Great Plains of central North America)

 Oenothera calcicola 
 Oenothera cinerea  – gaura-pilosa
 O. cinerea ssp. cinerea O. cinerea ssp. parksii 
 Oenothera filipes 
 Oenothera mckelveyae 
 Oenothera sinuosa  – wavy-leaf gaura

 Oenothera xenogaura  – (southern North America)

 Oenothera arida  – (Texas, Mexico)

Section GauropsisOenothera sect. Gauropsis  – Wyoming, western Nebraska, eastern Colorado, New Mexico, Kansas and the Texas Panhandle in the U.S. High Plains.

 Oenothera canescens  – spotted evening primrose

Section HartmanniaOenothera sect. Hartmannia  – Generally in Mexico, Arizona, and Texas. But O. speciosa extends into the U.S. Central Plains, and O. rosea extends to the Caribbean, and northern South America.

 Oenothera deserticola  – (Mexico)
 Oenothera platanorum  – Fort Huachuca evening primrose
 Oenothera rosea  – pink evening primrose, Rose of Mexico
 Oenothera speciosa  – showy evening primrose, Mexican primrose, amapola
 Oenothera texensis  – Texas evening primrose

Section KleiniaOenothera sect. Kleinia  – distributed over the Chihuahuan, Sonoran, and southern portions of the Great Basin deserts to the Great Plains, from southern Utah to southeastern Montana and western North Dakota, and northern Mexico.

 Oenothera albicaulis  – prairie evening-primrose
 Oenothera coronopifolia 

Section KneiffiaOenothera sect. Kneiffia  – eastern North America, at elevations up to 1900 m.

 Oenothera fruticosa  – narrow-leaved or southern sundrops (eastern North America) 
 O. fruticosa ssp. fruticosa – (more southern distribution)
 O. fruticosa ssp. glauca  – (more northern distribution)
 Oenothera perennis  – little evening primrose, perennial sundrops (North America)O. perennis Tropicos.org. Missouri Botanical Garden. 2011-12-09
 Oenothera pilosella  – prairie sundrops, meadow evening primrose
 O. pilosella ssp. pilosella – (eastern North America)
 O. pilosella ssp. sessilis  –
 Oenothera riparia  – riverbank sundropsRichard Dwight Porcher & Douglas Alan Rayner: A guide to the wildflowers of South Carolina, p.292 (2001)
 Oenothera spachiana  – Spach's evening-primrose

Section LavauxiaOenothera sect. Lavauxia  – North and South America.

 Oenothera acaulis  − (Chile)
 Oenothera centaurifolia  − (Uruguay, Brazil, Argentina)O. centaurifolia Tropicos.org. Missouri Botanical Garden 2011-12-09

 Oenothera acutissima  – Flaming Gorge evening primrose (Utah, Colorado)
 Oenothera flava  – yellow evening primrose (west & central North America)
 O. flava ssp. flava O. flava ssp. taraxacoides 
 Oenothera triloba  – stemless evening primrose (North America)

Section LeucocoryneOenothera sect. Leucocoryne  – from  southern Texas, through northern Mexico to the Trans-Volcanic Belt of central Mexico, southward to Guatemala, Nicaragua, and Costa Rica.

 Oenothera dissecta  - (Chihuahuan Desert)
 Oenothera kunthiana  - (southern Texas to Costa Rica)
 Oenothera luciae-julianiae  - (Mexico)
 Oenothera orizabae  - (Mexico)
 Oenothera tetraptera  - (Mexico, southern Texas)

Section MegapteriumOenothera sect. Megapterium  – distributed in south-central North America.

 Oenothera brachycarpa  – short-fruit evening primrose
 Oenothera howardii  – Howard's evening primrose
 Oenothera macrocarpa  – Missouri or big-fruit evening primrose
 O. macrocarpa ssp. fremontii  – Fremont's evening primrose
 O. macrocarpa ssp. incana  – big-fruit evening primrose
 O. macrocarpa ssp. macrocarpa – big-fruit evening primrose
 O. macrocarpa ssp. mexicana  – (Mexico)
 O. macrocarpa ssp. oklahomensis  – Oklahoma evening primrose

Section OenotheraOenothera sect. Oenothera – distributed from Canada to Panama.

 Oenothera clelandii  – Cleland's evening primrose
 Oenothera curtissii  – Curtiss' evening primrose
 Oenothera heterophylla  – variable-leaf evening primrose
 O. heterophylla ssp. heterophylla –
 O. heterophylla ssp. orientalis  –
 Oenothera rhombipetala 

 Oenothera macrosceles  – (Chihuahuan Desert)
 Oenothera maysillesii  – (Durango) 
 Oenothera organensis  – (New Mexico) 
 Oenothera stubbei  – (Nuevo León)

 series Allochroa

 Oenothera affinis  – (Bolivia, Brazil, Chile)
 Oenothera arequipensis  – (Chile)
 Oenothera bahia-blancae  – (Argentina)
 Oenothera catharinensis  – (Brazil)
 Oenothera coquimbensis  – (Chile)
 Oenothera featherstonei  – (Peru)
 Oenothera indecora 
 O. indecora ssp. boliviensis 
 O. indecora ssp. bonariensis 
 O. indecora ssp. indecora Oenothera mendocinensis  – (Argentina)
 Oenothera mollissima  – (Brazil)
 Oenothera montevidensis  – (Uruguay)
 Oenothera odorata  – (Argentina, Chile)
 Oenothera parodiana 
 O. parodiana ssp. brasiliensis  – (Argentina, Brazil, Uruguay)
 O. parodiana ssp. parodiana – (Argentina)
 O. parodiana ssp. strigulosa  – (Argentina)
 Oenothera picensis 
 O. picensis ssp. bonariensis  – (Argentina)
 O. picensis ssp. cordobensis  – (Argentina)
 O. picensis ssp. picensis – (Chile)
 Oenothera ravenii  – (Argentina, Brazil, Chile, Uruguay)
 O. ravenii ssp. argentinae  – (Argentina, Brazil)
 O. ravenii ssp. chilensis  – (Chile)  
 O. ravenii ssp. ravenii – (Brazil)
 Oenothera stricta 
 O. stricta ssp. altissima  – (Argentina)
 O. stricta ssp. argentinae  – (Argentina)
 O. stricta ssp. stricta – (Chile)

 series Clelandia

 Oenothera elongata  – (Bolivia, Peru)
 Oenothera punae  – (Bolivia)
 Oenothera siambonensis  – (Argentina)
 Oenothera villaricae  – (Argentina, Chile)

 series Renneria

 Oenothera longituba  – (Argentina)
 Oenothera nana  – (Argentina, Bolivia, Chile, Peru)
 Oenothera pedunculifolia  – (Argentina)
 Oenothera peruana  – (Chile, Peru)
 Oenothera sandiana  – (Chile, Ecuador)
 Oenothera santarii  – (Argentina)
 Oenothera scabra 
 O. scabra ssp. scabra – (Bolivia, Peru)
 O. scabra ssp. ucrosensis  – (Peru)
 Oenothera tafiensis 
 O. tafiensis ssp. parviflora  – (Argentina)
 O. tafiensis ssp. tafiensis – (Argentina)
 Oenothera tarijensis  – (Bolivia)
 Oenothera versicolor  – (Bolivia, Ecuador, Peru)

 Oenothera breedlovei  - (Mexico)
 Oenothera pennellii  - (Mexico)
 Oenothera pubescens  – South American evening primrose (southwestern U.S to western South America)
 Oenothera tamrae  - (Mexico)

 Oenothera argillicola  – shale-barren evening primrose
 Oenothera biennis  – common evening primrose (North America)
 Oenothera elata  – Hooker's evening primrose (western North America)
 O. elata ssp. elata – (Mexico, Central America) 
 O. elata ssp. hirsutissima  – (western U.S.) 
 O. elata ssp. hookeri 
 O. elata ssp. texensis  – (Texas)
 Oenothera glazioviana  – red-sepal evening primrose  (North America)
 Oenothera grandiflora  – large-flower evening primrose (eastern North America)
 Oenothera jamesii  – trumpet evening primrose (Mexico)
 Oenothera longissima  – long-stem evening primrose (southwestern North America)
 Oenothera nutans  – nodding evening primrose (eastern North America)
 Oenothera oakesiana  – Oakes' evening primrose (eastern North America)
 Oenothera parviflora  – northern evening primrose (North America)
 Oenothera villosa  – hairy evening primrose (North America)
 O. villosa ssp. strigosa 
 O. villosa ssp. villosa Oenothera wolfii  – Wolf's evening primrose (California)

 Oenothera drummondii  – beach evening primrose
 O. drummondii ssp. drummondii – (Atlantic coast, North Carolina to Mexico)
 O. drummondii ssp. thalassaphila  – (southern Baja California coast)
 Oenothera falfurriae  – royal evening primrose (southeastern Texas)
 Oenothera grandis  – showy evening primrose (U.S. & Mexico)
 Oenothera humifusa  – sea-beach evening primrose (southeast U.S.)
 Oenothera laciniata  – cutleaf evening primrose (North & South America)
 O. laciniata ssp. laciniata 
 O. laciniata ssp. pubescens  –  (Ecuador)
 Oenothera mexicana  – Mexican evening primrose (southeastern Texas)

Section PachylophusOenothera sect. Pachylophus  – western North America.
 Oenothera brandegeei  – (near Bahia de los Angeles)
 Oenothera cavernae  – cave-dwelling evening primrose
 Oenothera cespitosa 
 O. cespitosa ssp. cespitosa – tufted evening primrose (western North America)
 O. cespitosa ssp. crinita  – tufted evening primrose (southwest North America)
 O. cespitosa ssp. macroglottis  – tufted evening primrose
 O. cespitosa ssp. marginata  – tufted evening primrose
 O. cespitosa ssp. navajoensis  – Navajo evening primrose
 Oenothera harringtonii  – Colorado Springs evening primrose (Colorado)
 Oenothera psammophila  – St. Anthony Dunes evening primrose (Idaho)

Section ParadoxusOenothera sect. Paradoxus  – distribution within the Chihuahuan Desert.

 Oenothera havardii  − Havard's evening primrose (Arizona, Texas)

Section PeniophyllumOenothera sect. Peniophyllum  –
The single species is found in the southeastern U.S. 
 Oenothera linifolia  – thread-leaf evening primrose

Section RaveniaOenothera sect. Ravenia  – within Mexico.

 Oenothera muelleri  – (northeast Mexico)
 Oenothera riskindii  – (Coahuila)
 Oenothera tubifera 
 O. tubifera ssp. macrocarpa  – (Durango)
 O. tubifera ssp. tubiferaSection XanthocoryneOenothera sect. Xanthocoryne  – from central Mexico to northern South America.

 Oenothera epilobiifolia  – (Colombia, Mexico)
 O. epilobiifolia ssp. cuprea 
 O. epilobiifolia ssp. epilobiifolia – (Venezuela)
 Oenothera multicaulis  – (South America)
 Oenothera seifrizii''  – (Colombia, Venezuela)

References

Oenothera